Lists of the world's cheapest cities are developed by different institutions.

Economist Intelligence Unit
The Economist Intelligence Unit has analyzed the prices of more than 160 products and services in each city. The survey has been done considering the base city as New York, which has an index set at 100. Based on the survey of the Economist Intelligence Unit there are slight changes in the ranking of the cheapest cities in the world as compared to last year's report. One city from Pakistan and three major cities from India all are in the top ten cheapest cities in 2020. The main reason behind this is the low wages and high levels of income inequality, which restrict household expenses, as well as market competition.

The ten cheapest cities in the world 2020.
 Damascus, Syria
 Tashkent, Uzbekistan
 Almaty, Kazakhstan
 Buenos Aires, Argentina
 Karachi, Pakistan
 Caracas, Venezuela
 Lusaka, Zambia
 Chennai, India
 Bangalore, India
 New Delhi, India

TripIndex
According to TripIndex by TripAdvisor, five of ten cheapest cities in the world are located in Asia, with four of them located in ASEAN/South Asian countries. The research is based on costs of a one-night stay in a four-star hotel, cocktails, a two-course dinner with a bottle of wine, and a taxi transport (two return journeys of about 3.2 kilometres each). First is Hanoi with $141.12, second is Beijing with $159.05, third is Bangkok with $161.90, fifth is Kuala Lumpur with $194.43 and eighth is Jakarta with $204.59.

See also
 List of most expensive cities for expatriate employees
 Poverty threshold
 South-East Asian Tourism Organisation

References

Cheapest cities
Cheapest
Cities, cheapest
Cheapest cities